Krti or KRTI may refer to:
 Kriti (music), or kṛti, a concept in Indian classical music
 , a settlement in Buzet, Croatia
 KRTI, an American radio station

See also 
 Kriti (disambiguation)